Sasural Genda Phool 2 is an Indian television action romance drama  thriller series that aired on Star Bharat, starring Shagun Sharma and Jay Soni. It is a sequel of StarPlus's show, Sasural Genda Phool, which earlier starred Jay Soni and Ragini Khanna. It is digitally available on Disney+ Hotstar. The show premiered on 7 December 2021. However, the show went off air on 15 April 2022.

Plot
The show takes place seven years after the events of Sasural Genda Phool, revolving around Ishaan who is now a widower as Suhana has died. Ishaan is living with Suhana's memories and does not wish to remarry as per the promise he made to her. The Kashyap family is worried for him and keeps insisting him to remarry, bringing new marriage proposals for Ishaan everyday which annoys him; Ishaan manages to reject them with excuses.

Soon, Ishaan crosses paths with Tanya aka Titlee, a street-smart thief and con-woman, who hates relationships and doesn't believe in love as her dreams were shattered by her drunkard father. Ishaan and Titlee make a deal: Titlee would pretend to be Ishaan's girlfriend in front of his family and purposefully create a bad impression on them, to make them quit the thought of getting Ishaan remarried; while Ishaan would pay her in return for her help. They execute their plan and successfully manage to turn everyone against Titlee. Ishaan thanks Titlee for her help and pays her as promised, parting ways with her. Titlee slowly realises that while pretending to have feelings for Ishaan, she has actually fallen in love with him.

Jagdish, Titlee's father, gets drunk and accidentally exposes Ishaan and Titlee's secret to the Kashyaps. Shocked, the Kashyaps try to make Ishaan confess this but fail. Meanwhile, Ishaan stands by Titlee's side in her personal battles and emotionally supports her. He falls in love with her but feels guilty for betraying Suhana. Unwilling to move on from Suhana, a scared Ishaan confesses the truth to his family that Titlee is not his girlfriend and that he was putting up an act in front of them. Titlee breaks into tears after overhearing Ishaan declaring to his family that he doesn't love her.

Cast

Main
 Jay Soni as Ishaan Kashyap – Rano and Alok's son; Ishika's brother; Suhana's widower; Titli's  husband
 Shagun Sharma as Tanya aka Titli Awasthi Kashyap – A thief and con-woman; Jagdish’s daughter; Ishaan's wife

Recurring
Supriya Pilgaonkar as Shailaja Kashyap – Ishwar's wife; Inder and Panna's mother; Meethi's grandmother
 Sooraj Thapar as Alok Kashyap – Gayatri and Ambarnath's younger son; Ishwar, Urmi and Radha's brother; Rano's husband; Ishaan and Ishika's father 
 Shruti Ulfat as Rano Kashyap – Alok's wife; Ishaan and Ishika's mother
 Sudhir Pandey as Ambarnath Kashyap – Gayatri's husband; Ishwar, Alok, Urmi and Radha's father; Inder, Panna, Ishaan, Ishika, Deepak and Ilesh's grandfather
Anita Kanwal as Gayatri Kashyap – Ambarnath's wife; Ishwar, Alok, Urmi and Radha's mother; Inder, Panna, Ishaan, Ishika, Deepak and Ilesh's grandmother
 Jiten Lalwani as Indrabhan "Inder" Kashyap – Shailaja and Ishwar's son; Panna's brother; Rajni's husband; Meethi's father 
 Richa Soni as Rajni Kashyap – Inder's wife; Meethi's mother 
 Rashmi Singh as Ishika Kashyap – Rano and Alok's daughter; Ishaan's sister
 Shyam Mashalkar as Ilesh Bhardwaj – Urmi's son; Disha's husband 
 Ridheema Tiwari as Disha Bhardwaj – Ilesh's wife
 Maira Dharti Mehra as Meethi Kashyap – Rajni and Inder's daughter
 Ankit Sagar as Jagdish – A drunkard; Titli’s father.
 Dalljiet Kaur as Dr. Avni Sehgal – Ishaan's friend
 Ishaan Singh Manhas as Karan: Ishika's ex husband

Special appearances
 Ragini Khanna as Suhana Bajpai Kashyap – Ishaan's late wife

Production

Development
A puja was organised on the sets on October 26 post-which the shooting commenced for the show.

Casting
Almost all former cast-members from the first season were retained and talks were on with Ragini Khanna, who played the lead in the former season. However, Khanna refused returning as a lead-face on TV and hence she accepted to only play a cameo in the show as deceased Suhana.

New characters and entries too took place in the new season, like Dalljiet Kaur and few others.

Release
The first promo was released on 9 November 2021, featuring lead Jay Soni and Ragini Khanna.

The second promo was released on 24 November 2021, featuring the face-family, Jay Soni as Ishaan and lead Shagun Sharma as Titli.

References

Hindi-language television shows
Indian drama television series
Indian television soap operas
2021 Indian television series debuts
2022 Indian television series endings